Finding Me: A Decade of Darkness, a Life Reclaimed is a 2014 biographical memoir by American kidnapping survivor Michelle Knight and contributed by Michelle Burford. Knight's memoir tells the story of her tumultuous childhood in Cleveland, her estrangement from her family, and her fight for custody for her son, as well as being abducted, raped, tortured and kept into captivity for over a decade at the hands of her kidnapper, Ariel Castro.

Knight's book served as the outline for the Lifetime network movie Cleveland Abduction. The book debuted May 6, 2014, one year after Knight was rescued from captivity, in the number two spot on the New York Times Bestseller List. Knight's memoir was named to the top 20 best biographies and memoirs list by Amazon.com in 2014.

References

Non-fiction crime books
American memoirs
2014 non-fiction books